Nice Ass is the first studio album by the band Free Kitten, released in 1995 on Kill Rock Stars.

Critical reception
The Dallas Observer called the album a "sloppy pastiche of punk and funk [that] operates on the sort of wit that rhymes 'split ends' with 'Michael Jackson and his little friends.'" Caroline Sullivan reviewed the album unfavorably in the Guardian, writing, "The 15 songs, all of which were previously on singles or EPs, range from mildly amusing to not very (the gosh-this-is-fun screeching on the manic Secret Sex Friend). You can't imagine wanting to play this twice."

Track listing
"Harvest Spoon" - 2:42
"Rock of Ages" - 1:58
"Proper Band" - 1:45
"What's Fair" - 2:53
"Kissing Well" - 3:22
"Call Back (Episode XXI)" - 3:00
"Blindfold Test" - 2:29
"Greener Pastures" - 2:37
"Revlon Liberation Orchestra" - 2:46
"The Boasta" - 1:31
"Scratch tha DJ" - 1:59
"Secret Sex Friend" - 0:41
"Royal Flush" - 3:39
"Feelin'" - 0:58
"Alan Licked Has Ruined Music for an Entire Generation" - 0:07

Personnel
Kim Gordon - Vocals, Guitar, Drums on "The Boasta"
Julie Cafritz - Vocals, Guitar
Yoshimi P-We - Drums, Vocals, Trumpet, Harmonica, Guitar on "The Boasta"
Mark Ibold - Bass

References

1995 debut albums
Free Kitten albums
Kill Rock Stars albums